The 2017 L.League season was the 29th edition since its establishment. NTV Beleza were the defending champions, having won the Division 1 title in each of the past two seasons. The season began in March 2017 and ended in October 2017. NTV Beleza won the season, making it their 15th (and 3rd straight) Division 1 title.

Nadeshiko League Div.1 (Division 1)
The season began on 26 March 2017 and ended on 7 October 2017.

Teams

Table

Results

Attendance

Average home attendances
Ranked from highest to lowest average attendance.

Updated to games played on 7 October 2017.

Highest attendances

Updated to games played on 7 October 2017.

Top scorers

Updated: 7 October 2017.

Awards
The awards ceremony took place on 9 October 2017.

Best XI

Nadeshiko League Div.2 (Division 2)
The season began on 25 March 2017 and ended on 7 October 2017.

Teams

Table

Attendance

Average home attendances
Ranked from highest to lowest average attendance.

Updated to games played on 7 October 2017.

Highest attendances

Updated to games played on 7 October 2017.

Top scorers

Updated: 7 October 2017.

Awards
The awards ceremony took place on 9 October 2017.

Challenge League (Division 3)

Teams

East

West

Table

Regular season

East

West

Playoffs

Championship playoffs

5–8 overall position playoffs

9–12 overall position playoffs

Promotion/relegation Series

Division 1 promotion/relegation Series

 Cerezo Osaka Sakai Ladies are promoted to Division 1.
 Chifure AS Elfen Saitama are relegated to Division 2.

Division 2 promotion/relegation Series

 Bunnys Kyoto SC are promoted to Division 2.
 FC Kibi International University Charme are relegated to Division 3.

References

External links
 RSSSF
 Nadeshiko League: Stadium Guide

Nadeshiko League seasons
1
L
Japan
Japan